Blakelock may refer to:

 Keith Henry Blakelock, a London police constable who was killed by a mob during the 1985 Broadwater Farm riot.
 Ralph Albert Blakelock, a romanticist painter.
 Ralph Anthony Blakelock, a botanist.
 Thomas Aston Blakelock, an English-Canadian merchant and politician.
 T.A. Blakelock High School in Oakville, Ontario, named after Thomas Aston Blakelock.